Walter Kloepping Klaus (April 19, 1912–November 11, 2012) was an American politician and farmer.

Klaus was born in Empire Township, Dakota County, Minnesota. He graduated from Farmington High School in Farmington, Minnesota and from Hamline University. Klaus also studied at University of Minnesota. He was a farmer and lived in Farmington, Minnesota. Klaus served in the Minnesota House of Representatives from 1957 to 1974 and was a Republican. Klaus died in Farmington, Minnesota.

Notes

1912 births
2012 deaths
People from Farmington, Minnesota
Hamline University alumni
University of Minnesota alumni
Farmers from Minnesota
Republican Party members of the Minnesota House of Representatives
American centenarians
Men centenarians